Rhopalomyzus is a genus of true bugs belonging to the family Aphididae.

The species of this genus are found in Europe and Northern America.

Species:
 Rhopalomyzus alaica
 Rhopalomyzus codonopsidis
 Rhopalomyzus grabhami (Cockerell, 1903)

References

Aphididae